Heike Melchior (born  in Frankfurt) is a German wheelchair curler.

She participated in the 2018 Winter Paralympics where German wheelchair curling team finished on eighth place.

Teams

References

External links 
 
 
 
  (video)

1967 births
Living people
German female curlers
German wheelchair curlers
German disabled sportspeople
Paralympic wheelchair curlers of Germany
Wheelchair curlers at the 2018 Winter Paralympics
Sportspeople from Frankfurt
21st-century German women